Bigatti is an Italian surname. Notable people with this name include:

Alfredo Bigatti (1898–1964), Argentine sculptor
Anna Maria Bigatti, Italian mathematician
Carlo Bigatti (1779–1853), Italian composer
 (1910–1960), Italian priest, educator, and anti-fascist